The 1878 Vermont gubernatorial election took place on September 3, 1878. Incumbent Republican Horace Fairbanks, per the "Mountain Rule", did not run for re-election to a second term as Governor of Vermont. Republican candidate Redfield Proctor defeated Democratic candidate W. H. H. Bingham to succeed him.

Results

References

Vermont
1878
Gubernatorial
September 1878 events